Milton LeRoy "Moose" Gardner (July 2, 1894December 23, 1954) was a professional American football guard in the National Football League. He played for the Detroit Heralds/Tigers (1920–1921), the Buffalo All-Americans (1921), and the Green Bay Packers (1920–1926). He played at the collegiate level at the University of Wisconsin–Madison.

See also
Green Bay Packers players

External links

References

1894 births
1954 deaths
People from Ashland, Wisconsin
Players of American football from Wisconsin
American football offensive guards
Wisconsin Badgers football players
Detroit Heralds players
Detroit Tigers (NFL) players
Buffalo All-Americans players
Green Bay Packers players